The Sacrificed is an American Christian metal band who primarily play a power metal and progressive metal music. They come from Lakeland, Florida, where they  started making music in 2005, with frontman Eli Prinsen. They released two studio albums, 2012 in 2010 and III in 2012, both with Roxx Productions.

Background
The Sacrificed is a Christian metal band from Lakeland, Florida, where they formed in 2005. Their members are lead vocalist, Eli Prinsen, lead guitarist, Michael Phillips, bassist, Daniel Cordova, and drummer, Jay Williams, with their past member being guitarist, Johnny Bowden.

Music history
The band formed in 2005,  Their first release, an album called The DaVinci Hoax, was released independently in 2007. They released 2012, a studio album, on June 22, 2010, with Roxx Productions. Their subsequent studio album, III, was released by Roxx Productions, on January 31, 2012.

Members
Current members
 Eli Prinson - lead vocals (ex-Sacred Warrior)
 Michael Phillips - lead guitar (ex-Deliverance, ex-Fasedown)
 Daniel Cordova - bass (ex-Vengeance Rising, The Slave Eye, ex-Heretic, Shades of Crimson)
 Jay Williams - drums
Former members
 Johnny Bowden - guitar

Discography
Studio albums
 2012 (June 22, 2010, Roxx)
 III (January 31, 2012, Roxx)

References

External links
Facebook profile

Musical groups from Florida
2005 establishments in Florida
Musical groups established in 2005